A military academy or service academy is an educational institution which prepares candidates for service in the officer corps. It normally provides education in a military environment, the exact definition depending on the country concerned.

Three types of academy exist: pre-collegiate-level institutions awarding academic qualifications, university-level institutions awarding bachelor's-degree-level qualifications, and those preparing Officer Cadets for commissioning into the armed services of the state.

A naval academy is either a type of military academy (in the broad sense of that term) or is distinguished from one (in the narrow sense). In U.S. usage, the Military,  Naval, Coast Guard, and the Air Force Academy serve as military academies under the categorization of service academies in that country.

History
The first military academies were established in the 18th century to provide future officers for technically specialized corps, such as military engineers and artillery, with scientific training.

The Italian Military Academy was inaugurated in Turin on January 1, 1678, as the Savoy Royal Academy, making it the oldest military academy in existence. The Royal Danish Naval Academy was set up in 1701. The Royal Military Academy, Woolwich was set up in 1741, after a false start in 1720 because of a lack of funds, as the earliest military academy in Britain. Its original purpose was to train cadets entering the Royal Artillery and Royal Engineers. In France, the École Royale du Génie at Mézières was founded in 1748, followed by a non-technical academy in 1751, the École Royale Militaire offering a general military education to the nobility. French military academies were widely copied in Prussia, Austria, Russia. The Norwegian Military Academy in Oslo, educates officers of the Norwegian Army. The academy was established in 1750, and is the oldest institution for higher education in Norway.

By the turn of the century, under the impetus of the Napoleonic Wars and the strain that the armies of Europe subsequently came under, military academies for the training of commissioned officers of the army were set up in most of the combatant nations. These military schools had two functions: to provide instruction for serving officers in the functions of the efficient staff-officer, and to school youngsters before they gained an officer's commission. The Kriegsakademie in Prussia was founded in 1801 and the École spéciale militaire de Saint-Cyr was created by order of Napoleon Bonaparte in 1802 as a replacement for the École Royale Militaire of the Ancien Régime (the institution that Napoleon himself had graduated from). 

The Royal Military College, Sandhurst, in England was the brainchild of John Le Marchant in 1801, who established schools for the military instruction of officers at High Wycombe and Great Marlow, with a grant of £30,000 from Parliament. The two original departments were later combined and moved to Sandhurst.

In the United States, the United States Military Academy (USMA) in West Point, New York was founded on March 16, 1802, and is one of five service academies in the nation.

Types

Pre-collegiate institutions

A military school teaches children of various ages (elementary school, middle school or high school) in a military environment which includes training in military aspects, such as drill. Many military schools are also boarding schools, and others are simply magnet schools in a larger school system. Many are privately run institutions, though some are public and are run either by a public school system (such as the Chicago Public Schools) or by a state.

Adult institutions
A college-level military academy is an institute of higher learning of things military. It is part of a larger system of military education and training institutions. The primary educational goal at military academies is to provide a high quality education that includes significant coursework and training in the fields of military tactics and military strategy. The amount of non-military coursework varies by both the institution and the country, and the amount of practical military experience gained varies as well.

Military academies may or may not grant university degrees. In the US, graduates have a major field of study, earning a Bachelor's degree in that subject just as at other universities. However, in British academies, the graduate does not achieve a university degree, since the whole of the one-year course (undertaken mainly but not exclusively by university graduates) is dedicated to military training.

There are two types of military academies: national (government-run) and state/private-run.
Graduates from national academies are typically commissioned as officers in the country's military. The new officers usually have an obligation to serve for a certain number of years. In some countries (e.g. Britain) all military officers train at the appropriate academy, whereas in others (e.g. the United States) only a percentage do and the service academies are seen as institutions which supply service-specific officers within the forces (about 15 percent of US military officers).
State or private-run academy graduates have no requirement to join the military after graduation, although some schools have a high rate of graduate military service. Today, most of these schools have ventured away from their military roots and now enroll both military and civilian students. The only exception in the United States is the Virginia Military Institute which remains all-military.

Albania
Armed Forces Academy

Angola
 Army Military Academy
 National Air Force Academy
 Naval Academy

Argentina

Argentine Army:
 Colegio Militar de la Nación (National Military College), in El Palomar, Buenos Aires (northwestern outskirts of Buenos Aires)

Argentine Navy:
 Escuela Naval Militar (Naval Military School), in Río Santiago, Buenos Aires (in Ensenada, near La Plata)

Argentine Air Force:
 Escuela de Aviación Militar (Military Aviation School), in the city of Córdoba

Armenia
 National Defense Research University
 Vazgen Sargsyan Military Institute
 Armenak Khanperyants Military Aviation University

Australia

Australian Defence Force Academy
Royal Australian Naval College
Royal Military College, Duntroon
Officers' Training School RAAF

Austria
Theresian Military Academy
Landesverteidigungsakademie

Azerbaijan
War College of the Azerbaijani Armed Forces
Azerbaijan Higher Military Academy

Bangladesh

Bangladesh Military Academy
Bangladesh Naval Academy
Bangladesh Air Force Academy
Armed Forces Medical College (AFMC), Airport Road, Dhaka

Cadet colleges in Bangladesh

Belarus
 Military Academy of Belarus
 Border Guard Service Institute of Belarus
 Ministry of the Interior Academy of the Republic of Belarus

Belgium
Royal Military Academy (Belgium)

Bolivia
Military College of Bolivia (Colegio Militar del Ejército de Bolivia)
Bolivian Military Naval Academy
 Bolivian Air Force Academy

Brazil

Basic Education
(offers an education with military values for civilians students of primary and secondary school)Brazilian Army:
 Sistema Colégio Militar do Brasil (SCMB) (Military High School of Brazil System)
 Colégio Militar de Belém (CMBel) (Military High School of Belém)
 Colégio Militar de Belo Horizonte (CMBH) (Military High School of Belo Horizonte)
 Colégio Militar de Brasília (CMB) (Military High School of Brasília)
 Colégio Militar de Campo Grande (CMCG) (Military High School of Campo Grande)
 Colégio Militar de Curitiba (CMC) (Military High School of Curitiba)
 Colégio Militar de Fortaleza (CMF) (Military High School of Fortaleza)
 Colégio Militar de Juiz de Fora (CMJF) (Military High School of Juiz de Fora)
 Colégio Militar de Manaus (CMM) (Military High School of Manaus)
 Colégio Militar de Porto Alegre (CMPA) (Military High School of Porto Alegre)
 Colégio Militar do Recife (CMR) (Military High School of Recife)
 Colégio Militar do Rio de Janeiro (CMRJ) (Military High School of Rio de Janeiro)
 Colégio Militar de Salvador (CMS) (Military High School of Salvador)
 Colégio Militar de Santa Maria (CMSM) (Military High School of Santa Maria)
 Colégio Militar de São Paulo (CMSP) (Military High School of São Paulo)

Preparatory Schools
(prepares students for admission to one of the official training academies)Brazilian Army:
 Escola Preparatória de Cadetes do Exército (EsPCEx) (Army Cadets Preparatory School)

Brazil's Navy:

 Colégio Naval (CN) (Naval High School)

Brazilian Air Force:

 Escola Preparatória de Cadetes do Ar (EPCAR) (Air Cadets Preparatory School)

Sailor and Marine Soldier Training
Brazil's Navy:

 Centro de Instrução Almirante Milcíades Portela Alves (CIAMPA) (Admiral Milcíades Portela Alves Instruction Center)
 Centro de Instrução e Adestramento de Brasília (CIAB) (Brasília Instruction and Training Center)
 Escola de Aprendizes-Marinheiros (EAM) (Apprentices-Sailors School)
 Escola de Aprendizes-Marinheiros do Ceará (EAMCE) (Ceará Apprentices-Sailors School)
 Escola de Aprendizes-Marinheiros do Espírito Santo (EAMES) (Espirito Santo Apprentices-Sailors School)
 Escola de Aprendizes-Marinheiros de Pernambuco (EAMPE) (Pernambuco Apprentices-Sailors School)
 Escola de Aprendizes-Marinheiros de Santa Catarina (EAMSC) (Santa Catarina Apprentices-Sailors School)

Sergeants Training

Brazilian Army:
 Escola de Sargento das Armas (ESA) (Sergeant of Arms School)
 Escola de Sargento de Logística (EsSLog) (Sergeant of Logistics School)
 Centro de Instrução de Aviação do Exército (CiAvEx) (Army Aviation Instruction Center)

Brazil's Navy:

 Centro de Instrução Almirante Alexandrino (CIAA) (Admiral Alexandrino Instruction Center)
 Centro de Instrução Almirante Sylvio de Camargo (CIASC) (Admiral Sylvio de Camargo Instruction Center)

Brazilian Air Force:
 Escola de Especialistas da Aeronáutica (EEAR) (Air Force Specialists School)

Officers Training

Brazilian Army:
 Academia Militar das Agulhas Negras (AMAN) (Agulhas Negras Military Academy)
 Escola de Formação Complementar do Exército (EsFCEx) (Army Complementary Training School)
 Escola de Saúde do Exército (EsSEx) (Army Health School)
 Instituto Militar de Engenharia (IME) (Military Institute of Engineering)
Brazil's navy:

 Centro de Instrução Almirante Wandenkolk (CIAW) (Admiral Wandekolk Instruction Center)
 Escola de Formação de Oficiais da Marinha Mercante (EFOMM) (Merchant Navy Officers Training School)
 Escola Naval (EN) (Naval School)

Brazilian Air Force:

 Academia da Força Aérea (AFA) (Air Force Academy)
 Centro de Instrução e Adaptação da Aeronáutica (CIAAR) (Air Force Instruction and Adaptation Center)
 Instituto Tecnológico de Aeronáutica (ITA) (Aeronautics Institute of Technology)

Bulgaria
 Vasil Levski National Military University founded in 1878 as a military school in Plovdiv
Air Force Faculty in Dolna Mitropoliya
Artillery, Air Defence and CIS Faculty in Shumen
All-Force Faculty faculty in Veliko Tarnovo
 Nikola Vaptsarov Naval Academy in Varna and founded in 1881 as Naval Machinery School in Rousse
 Rakovski Defence and Staff College in Sofia, founded with an Act of the 15th National Assembly of March 1, 1912, in Sofia

Canada

Two post-secondary military academies are operated under the Canadian Military Colleges system, the Royal Military College of Canada (RMCC) in Kingston, Ontario; and Royal Military College Saint-Jean (RMC Saint-Jean) in Saint-Jean-sur-Richelieu, Quebec. RMCC was established in 1876, while RMC Saint-Jean was established in 1954. The two institutions provided military education to officer cadets of all three elements in the Canadian Forces; the navy, army and air force; with RMC granted the authority to confer academic degrees in arts, science and engineering by the 1960s. From 1940 to 1995, the Department of National Defence operated a third military college in Victoria, British Columbia, known as Royal Roads Military College (RRMC).

Graduates of the Colleges are widely acknowledged to have had a disproportionate impact in the Canadian services and society, thanks to the solid foundations provided by their military education. Military discipline and training, as well as a focus on physical fitness and fluency in both of Canada's two official languages, English and French, provided cadets with ample challenges and a very fulfilling experience. In 1995 the Department of National Defence was forced to close RRMC and RMC Saint-Jean due to budget considerations, but RMCC continues to operate.
RRMC reopened as a civilian university in the fall of 1995, and is maintained by the Government of British Columbia. In 2007, the Department of National Defence reopened RMC Saint-Jean as a military academy that offers equivalent schooling as CEGEP, a level of post-secondary education in Quebec's education system. In 2021 RMC Saint-Jean was returned to University status and had officer cadets graduate and received their commission for the first time since 1995.

In addition to Canadian Military Colleges, the Canadian Armed Forces also operate a number of training centres and schools, including the Canadian Forces College, and the Canadian Forces Language School. The components of the Canadian Armed Forces also maintain training centres and schools. The Canadian Army Doctrine and Training Centre (CADTC) is a formation in the Army that delivers combat, and doctrinal training. The CADTC includes several training establishments, such as the Canadian Manoeuvre Training Centre, Combat Training Centre, Command and Staff College, and the Peace Support Training Centre. The 2 Canadian Air Division is the formation responsible for training in the Royal Canadian Air Force (RCAF), and includes establishments like the Royal Canadian Air Force Academy, 2 Canadian Forces Flying Training School, and 3 Canadian Forces Flying Training School. The RCAF also maintains the Canadian Forces School of Survival and Aeromedical Training.

In addition to publicly operated institutions, Canada is also home to one private military boarding school, Robert Land Academy, in West Lincoln, Ontario. Founded in 1978, it is an all-boys' institute that is fully accredited by Ontario's Ministry of Education. The school offers elementary and secondary levels of education, providing schooling for students from Grade 6 to Grade 12.

Colombia

National Army of Colombia:
José María Córdova Military School, in Bogotá.
Colombian Army NCO School
Colombian Air Force:
Marco Fidel Suarez Military Aviation School, in Cali.
Colombian Naval Infantry and Colombian Navy:
Admiral Padilla Naval Academy, in Cartagena de Indias.
National Police of Colombia:
General Santander National Police Academy, in Bogotá.

Czech Republic
 Univerzita Obrany (University of Defence)
 Military academy and training command

Democratic People's Republic of Korea
 Kim Jong-un National Defense University
 Kim Il-sung Military University
 Kim Il-sung Military Political University
 Kim Jong-suk Naval Academy
 Kim Chaek Air Force Academy

Denmark

Royal Danish Defence College
Royal Danish Military Academy
Royal Danish Naval Academy
Royal Danish Air Force Officers School

Egypt
Egyptian Air Defense Academy
Egyptian Military Technical College
Egyptian Military medical college
Egyptian Air Academy
Egyptian Military Academy
Egyptian Naval Academy

El Salvador
Captain General Gerardo Barrios Military School

Estonia

Estonian Military Academy
Baltic Defence College, both in Tartu

Finland

 
Finnish National Defence University (Maanpuolustuskorkeakoulu), on Santahamina island, Helsinki

France

High schools
Lycée militaire de Saint-Cyr
Lycée militaire d'Autun
Prytanée National Militaire
Lycée militaire d'Aix-en-Provence
Lycée naval de Brest
École des Pupilles de l'Air

Officer academies

École spéciale militaire de Saint-Cyr (ESM, literally the "Special Military School of St Cyr") is the French Military Academy. It is often referred to as "Saint-Cyr". Founded by Napoleon in 1802, and initially in Fontainebleau, it was moved first to Saint-Cyr-l'École in 1808, and then to Coëtquidan (Brittany) in 1945.
École militaire interarmes (EMIA)
École des commissaires des armées (ECA), founded in 2013
École de l'air: the French Air Force Academy
École Navale: the French Naval Academy
 École des officiers de la gendarmerie nationale (EOGN): gendarmerie commissioned officers academy
École Polytechnique (X): a French engineering grande école of military status. Though all of its French engineering students are enlisted and trained as officers, 5% of its graduates remain in the military after graduation.
 ENSTA Bretagne: a French engineering grande école of military status. Only 1/4 of its students are actual officers-in-training.
 École de Santé des Armées: medical school of French army
 National Military Infrastructure Engineers Academy: trains military engineers of the Armed Forces, opened 2013 (also one of the newest)

Postgraduate academies
 École d'état-major (Staff school): first step of higher military studies, for officer of OF-2 rank.
 École de Guerre (War School): second step of higher military studies, mainly for ranks OF-2 and OF-3 who want to continue the command track (e.g. to command battalion or regiment).
 Collège d'enseignement supérieur de l'armée de terre (Army Higher Education College): second step of military education, but for officers whishing to achieve a high-level specialization.
 Cours supérieur d'état-major (Advanced Staff Course)
 Enseignement militaire supérieur scientifique et technique (Higher Technical and Scientific Education).
 Centre des hautes études militaire (Center for Advanced Military Studies): final step of military education, for very few selected OF-5. Its students also attend the civilian institut des hautes études de défense nationale.

Georgia
National Defense Academy 
Cadet Bachelor School
Junior Officer Basic School
Aviation Air Defense Officer Basic School
Medical Officer School
Captain Career School
Command and General Staff School
School of Advance Defense Studies
Language Training School

Germany

Germany has a unique system for civil and military education. The only true military academy is the Führungsakademie der Bundeswehr where mainly future staff officers and general staff officers are further trained.

The standard education in military leadership is the task of the Offizierschulen (officers' schools) run by the three branches. The contents differ from branch to branch. According to the doctrine "leading by task", in the army all prospective platoon leaders are trained down to the level of a commander of a mixed combat battalion. There they also have to pass an officer exam to become commissioned later on.

Moreover, there exist so called Waffenschulen (school of weapons) like infantry school or artillery school. There the officers learn to deal with the typical tasks of their respective corps.

A specialty of the German concept of officer formation is the academic education. Germany runs two Universities of the German Federal Armed Forces where almost every future officer has to pass non-military studies and achieve a bachelor's or master's degree. During their studies (after at least three years of service) the candidates become commissioned Leutnant (second lieutenant).

The three officer's schools are:

 The German Navy supervises:
 Naval Academy at Mürwik, in Flensburg-Mürwik
 The German Army supervises:
 Offizierschule des Heeres,  in Dresden
 The German Air Force supervises:
 Offizierschule der Luftwaffe,  in Fürstenfeldbruck

Academic and staff education:

 Universities of the German Federal Armed Forces
 Helmut Schmidt University, in Hamburg
 Bundeswehr University Munich, in Munich
 Führungsakademie der Bundeswehr, in Hamburg

Greece

The Hellenic Armed Forces have military academies supervised by each branch of the Armed Forces individually:

Highest Military Academies (ΑΣΣ) or Higher Military Educational Institutions (ΑΣΕΙ):

The Hellenic Army supervises:
The Evelpidon Military Academy, in Athens.
The Corps Officers Military Academy, in Thessaloniki.
The Nursery Officers Academy, in Athens.
The Hellenic Air Force supervises:
 The Icarus Air Force Academy, in Tatoi (Athens).
The Hellenic Navy supervises:
 The Hellenic Naval Cadets Academy, in Piraeus.
Higher Military NCO Academies (ΑΣΣΥ):
The Hellenic Army supervises the Military Non-commissioned Officers' Academy (ΣΜΥ).
The Hellenic Air Force supervises the Air Force Non-commissioned Officers' Academy (ΣΜΥΑ).
The Hellenic Navy supervises the Naval Non-commissioned Officers' Academy (ΣΜΥΝ).
It is worth noting that, despite their names, their alumni can advance to the rank of Antisyntagmatarchis/Antipterachos/Antiploiarchos.

Hungary
 National University of Public Service (Successor of Royal Hungarian Ludovica Military Academy, which founded in 1808)
 Faculty of Military Sciences and Officer Training

India

Indonesia

The Indonesian Military Academy was founded in Yogyakarta, October 13, 1945, by the order of General Staff Chief of Indonesia Army Lieutenant General Urip Sumohardjo as the Militaire Academie (MA) Yogyakarta.

Currently, the Tentara Nasional Indonesia or the TNI (Indonesian National Armed Forces), under the supervision of the Commanding General of the Indonesian National Armed Forces Academy System (a two or three-star officer in billet) in the HQ of the Indonesian National Armed Forces, has divided the academies into the three respective services:

 Indonesian Military Academy (Akademi Militer; Akmil), in Magelang, Central Java, is under the supervision of the Chief of Staff of the Indonesian Army, operated since 1946.
 Indonesian Naval Academy (Akademi Angkatan Laut; AAL), in Surabaya, East Java, is under the supervision of the Chief of Staff of the Indonesian Navy. The Indonesian Naval Academy also educates and forms officers to serve in the Indonesian Marine Corps. In existence since 1951. 
 Indonesian Air Force Academy (Akademi Angkatan Udara; AAU), in Yogyakarta, is under the supervision of the Chief of Staff of the Indonesian Air Force. The academy has three majorings which are: electronics, engineering, and administration. Following graduation, students who are selected as Pilot and Navigator conduct further training in the Pilot and Navigator Flight School prior bearing the Pilot/Navigator designation. Active since 1945, but also inherits the traditions of former Dutch military aviation schools.

Each service academy is headed by a two-star general who serves as superintendent, and his/her deputy is a one-star officer. All the students (cadets/midshipman) are recruited from senior high school graduates from all over Indonesia. Shortly after graduation, they are commissioned as Letnan Dua (Second Lieutenant/Ensign)) in their respective service branches and get the Diploma IV (Associate degree, 4th Grade) comparable to civil academies or universities. The length term is now 4 years and is divided into five grades of cadets' ranks, starting from the lowest:

 Prajurit Taruna/Kadet/Karbol (Cadet Private), 1st year (4 months)
 Kopral Taruna/Kadet/Karbol (Cadet Corporal), 1st year (8 months)
 Sersan Taruna/Kadet/Karbol (Cadet Sergeant), 2nd year
 Sersan Mayor Dua Taruna/Kadet/Karbol (Cadet Second Sergeant Major), 3rd year
 Sersan Mayor Satu Taruna/Kadet/Karbol (Cadet First Sergeant Major), 4th year

Taruna refers to cadets in the Military Academy, Kadet refers to cadets in the Naval Academy, and Karbol refers to cadets in the Air Force Academy. The term "Taruna" however still applies to all cadets from the three academies.

Until 1999, before the Indonesian National Police officially separated from the armed forces, the Indonesian Police Academy ("AKPOL") also stood under the National Armed Forces Academy but now has separated from the Military and is under the auspices of the President of Indonesia controlled by the National Police Headquarters (Mabes Polri), where in the other hand the Armed Forces (Army, Naval, and Air Force) Academies of Indonesia is under the auspices of the Ministry of Defense controlled by the Armed Forces General Headquarters (Mabes TNI). Presently, the Police Academy is in Semarang (Central Java), and is supervised under the supervision of the Chief of the Indonesian National Police (Kapolri).

All three academies and the Police Academy have a joint 4th class cadet training program since 2008, after completing it the cadets go to their respective academies to continue with the three remaining years of study before commissioning.

Iran
Iran has five main military universities:
 Imam Ali Officers' University (Persian: دانشگاه افسری امام علی; acronym: دا اف, DĀʿAF), formerly known as Officers' School (Persian: دانشکده افسری) is the military academy of Ground Forces of Islamic Republic of Iran Army, in Tehran, Iran.
 Shahid Sattari Aeronautical University (Persian: دانشگاه علوم و فنون هوایی شهید ستاری) is the military academy of Islamic Republic of Iran Air Force, in Tehran, Iran.
 Imam Khomeini Naval University of Noshahr (Persian: دانشگاه علوم و فنون دریایی امام خمینی) is the military academy of Islamic Republic of Iran Navy, in Noshahr, Mazandaran, Iran.
 Khatam al-Anbia Air Defense Academy (Persian: دانشگاه پدافند هوایی خاتم‌الانبیاء آجا) is the military academy of Islamic Republic of Iran Air Defense Force, in Tehran, Iran.
 Imam Hossein University (Persian: دانشگاه امام حسین‎; acronym: IHU) is the military academy of the Islamic Revolutionary Guard Corps, in Tehran, Iran.
Amir Al-Momenin University of Military Sciences and Technology

Israel 
Israeli Naval Academy

Italy

High school level institutions (only for classical and scientific liceum, starting from grade 10):
Scuola Militare Nunziatella, founded during the Bourbon Period in 1787, in Italian Army, Naples
Scuola Militare Teulié, founded during the Napoleonic period in 1802, Italian Army, Milan
Scuola Militare Navale Morosini, Italian Navy, Venice
Scuola Militare Aeronautica Douhet, Italian Air Force, Florence

2009–2010 school year was the first school year with girls attending.

Non Commissioned Officer (NCO) schools:

 Army: Scuola sottufficiali dell'Esercito Italiano, Viterbo 
 Navy: Scuola sottufficiali della Marina Militare, Taranto and Law Maddalena
 Air Force: Scuola marescialli dell'Aeronautica Militare, Viterbo
 Carabinieri: Scuola marescialli e brigadieri dei carabinieri, Firenze
 Guardia di Finanza: Scuola ispettori e sovrintendenti della Guardia di Finanza, L'Aquila

University level institutions:
Military Academy of Modena
Scuola di Applicazione, Torino
Accademia Navale, Livorno
Accademia Aeronautica, Pozzuoli
Scuola Ufficiali Carabinieri, Rome
Accademia della Guardia di Finanza, Bergamo

Japan

Universities 
National Defense Academy of Japan
National Defense Medical College

Officer Candidate Schools 
JGSFD Officer Candidate School, Kurume
JMSDF Officer Candidate School, Etajima (Naval Academy Etajima)
JASDF Officer Candidate School, Nara

Offcer Colleges 

 Joint Staff College
 JGSDF Training Evaluation Research and Development Command
 JMSDF Staff College
 JASDF Staff College

Kazakhstan

 National Defense University
 Military Institute of the Kazakh Ground Forces (formerly the Alma-Ata Higher All-Arms Command School)
 Talgat Bigeldinov Military Institute of the Air Defence Forces
 Military Engineering Institute of Radio Electronics and Communications

Kyrgyzstan

 Military Institute of the Armed Forces of the Kyrgyz Republic
 Center for Advanced Training of Officers

Malaysia

Secondary level institutions:
 Royal Military College (Malaysia) (Maktab Tentera Diraja)

University level:
 National Defence University of Malaysia (University Pertahanan Nasional Malaysia) (foundation, bachelor's degree, master's degree, PhD and specialist courses)
 Armed Forces Defence College (Maktab Pertahanan Angkatan Tentera)

Specialist training and staff institutions:
 Officers Cadet School in Port Dickson (OCS)
 Malaysian Armed Forces Staff College (Maktab Turus Angkatan Tentera)
 Armed Forces Health Training Institute (Institut Latihan Kesihatan Angkatan Tentera)
 Malaysian Peacekeeping Training Centre (Pusat Latihan Pengaman Malaysia)

Reserve Officer Training Units ( or ) or ROTU exists only in public universities in Malaysia. This is a tertiary institution based officer commissioning program to equip students as officer cadets with military knowledge and understanding for service as Commissioned Officers in the reserve components of the various branches of the Malaysian Armed Forces.

Mexico

 Heroica Escuela Naval Militar
 Heroico Colegio Militar
 Colegio del Aire

Moldova
 Alexandru cel Bun Military Academy

Mongolia
 National Defense University
 Military Music College of Mongolia

Myanmar
 Defence Services Academy
 Defence Services Technological Academy
 Defence Services Medical Academy
 Officer Training School (Myanmar) (OTS)
 National Defence College (Myanmar) (NDC)
 Defence Services Institute of Nursing and Paramedical Science

Namibia
Namibian Military School

Netherlands

Koninklijke Militaire Academie
Royal Naval College (Netherlands)

New Zealand
Tier One – initial officer training
 New Zealand Commissioning Course, Waiouru (NZ Army)
 Initial Officer Training, Woodbourne (RNZAF)
 Officer Training School, Devonport Naval Base

Tier Two – junior officer education
 NZDF Junior Staff Course, New Zealand Defence College

Tier Three – senior officer education
 NZDF Staff Course, New Zealand Defence College

Nigeria

High school training
 Nigerian Military School, Zaria – Nigerian Army military school for boys
 Air Force Military School, Jos, Nigeria, in Jos – Nigerian Air Force military school for boys
 Nigerian Navy Military School, Ikot Ntuen, Akwa Ibom State – Nigerian Navy military School for boys

Undergraduate officer training
 Nigerian Defence Academy, Kaduna – Nigerian Armed Forces university school

Postgraduate officer training
 Armed Forces Command and Staff College, Jaji, at Jaji, Kaduna – joint Nigerian Armed Forces higher studies institute for both indigenous and international students
 Nigerian Army College of Logistics, Lagos – school for training middle career Nigerian Army officers on military logistics
 National Defence College, Abuja – school for training senior officers of the Nigerian Armed Forces and also some members of the civil service
Army War College Nigeria
Naval War College Nigeria
Air War College Nigeria

Norway

Undergraduate officer training
 Norwegian Military Academy, Linderud/Oslo (Norwegian Army)
 Norwegian Naval Academy, Laksevåg/Bergen (Royal Norwegian Navy)
 Norwegian Air Force Academy, Trondheim (Royal Norwegian Air Force)

Postgraduate training
 Norwegian Defence Staff College, Oslo (joint)
 Norwegian National Defence College, Oslo (civil service/very senior officers)

Pakistan

 Pakistan Military Academy, Kakul
 Pakistan Air Force Academy, Risalpur
 Pakistan Naval Academy, Karachi
 Command and Staff College, Quetta
 National Defence University, Islamabad
 Pakistan Navy War College, Lahore
 PAF Air War College, Karachi
 Army Burn Hall College, for boys, Abbottabad
 Army Public College of Management Sciences (public sector)
 Military College Jhelum, Jhelum District
 Military College Murree, Rawalpindi District
 Military College Sui, Dera Bugti District
 PAF College Sargodha
 PAF College Murre Hills
 Cadet College Razmak, Razmak North Waziristan Agency
 Cadet College Kohat
 Cadet College Wana
 Cadet College Spinkai
 Cadet College Mastung
 Cadet College Petaro, Pakistan Navy
 Garrison Cadet College Kohat
 Cadet College Skardu

Paraguay

 Francisco López Military Academy, in Capiatá, Paraguay

People's Republic of China

PLA National Defense University
National University of Defense Technology
PLA Information Engineering University
Army Command College of the Chinese People's Liberation Army

Peru
Undergraduate officer training
 Chorrillos Military School (Peruvian Army)
 Peruvian Naval School (Peruvian Navy)
 Peruvian Air Force Officers' School (Peruvian Air Force)

Philippines

The Philippines patterned all its service academies after the United States Military Academy (West Point) and the United States Merchant Marine Academy (King's Point).

These higher education institutions are operated by the Philippine Government and grant different baccalaureate degrees.

Philippine Military Academy (Akademiyang Militar ng Pilipinas), City of Baguio – It is the primary training school of the Armed Forces of the Philippines for would be regular commissioned officers of the Philippine Army, Philippine Navy, Philippine Marine Corps and the Philippine Air Force. It is under the control of the Department of National Defense. Its former name was the Philippine Constabulary Academy. During the American colonial rule era, U.S. Army Cavalry Officers established the school for the professionalization of the enlisted personnel of the defunct Philippine Constabulary. It was renamed the Philippine Military Academy before the 1930s.  In 1992, PMA stopped providing graduates to the Philippine Constabulary after the passage of Republic Act 6975 which resulted in the merger of the Philippine Constabulary and the Integrated National Police. The merged institutions was named the Philippine National Police. Beginning in 1993, PMA became a co-educational school.
Philippine Merchant Marine Academy, Zambales – It is a school for students who shall serve in different private shipping companies, foreign or local. Its graduates may serve in the Philippine Coast Guard and the Philippine Navy as an ensign after graduation depending upon their choice. All PMMA graduates are also automatically appointed by the president of the Philippines as ensigns (2nd lieutenants) in the Philippine Navy Reserve. This is the oldest of the Philippine service academies having been established in 1820 during the long period of Spanish colonial rule in the country, and was first situated in Manila for many years.

Aside from the PMA and the PMMA, all three branches of the AFP have their own Officer Candidate Course Programs for both men and women, patterned after their US counterparts.

The nation's higher military colleges are:
 Armed Forces of the Philippines Command and General Staff College, Quezon City – educates officers of the AFP not exceeding the ranks of Colonel or Navy Captain
 National Defense College of the Philippines, Quezon City – is a school for senior AFP officers for military/naval planning and to ready them in holding the ranks of Brigadier General/Commodore. Notable civilians may enroll and be given the honorary rank of Lieutenant Colonel/Commander in the AFP Reserve upon graduation.

Poland

War Studies University
Jarosław Dąbrowski Military University of Technology in Warsaw
Tadeusz Kościuszko Land Forces Military Academy in Wrocław
Polish Air Force Academy in Dęblin
Heroes of Westerplatte Naval Academy in Gdynia
Faculty of Military Medicine of the Medical University in Łódź

Portugal

Pre-university level institution
 Colégio Militar, Lisbon – military basic and high school
 Instituto dos Pupilos do Exército, Lisbon – vocational education military school

Undergraduate officer training

 Academia Militar, Lisbon and Amadora – Portuguese Army and Republican National Guard university school
 Escola Naval, Almada – Portuguese Navy university school
 Academia da Força Aérea, Sintra – Portuguese Air Force university school

Postgraduate and staff training
 Instituto de Estudos Superiores Militares, Lisbon – joint command and staff college

Republic of China (Taiwan)
R.O.C. Military Academy
R.O.C. Naval Academy
R.O.C. Air Force Academy
R.O.C. Air Force Institute of Technology
Army Academy R.O.C.
National Defense University
 War College
 Army Command and Staff College
 Naval Command and Staff College
 Air Force Command and Staff College
 Institute of Technology
 Management College
 Political Warfare College
National Defense Medical Center
Chung-cheng Armed Forces Preparatory School

Republic of Ireland
 Defence Forces Training Centre
 Naval College
 Air Corps College

Republic of Korea

The three main military academies:
 Korea Military Academy (Army)
 Korea Naval Academy
 Korea Air Force Academy

Other military academies:
 Korea Army Academy at Yeongcheon, formerly Korea Third Military Academy
 Armed Forces Nursing Academy

Romania
 Carol I National Defence University (Universitatea Națională de Apărare Carol I), Bucharest
 Technical Military Academy (Academia Tehnică Militară), Bucharest
 Land Forces:
Nicolae Bălcescu Land Forces Academy, Sibiu
 Air Forces:
Academia Forțelor Aeriene (Air Forces Academy), Braṣov
 Naval Forces:
Mircea cel Bătrân Naval Academy, Constanṭa

Russia
See also: Cadet Corps (Russia), Military academies in Russia

First stage of training
 The Cadet Corps is an admissions-based military middle school for young boys that was founded in the Russian Empire in 1732, soon becoming widespread throughout the country.
Omsk Cadet Corps
Karelia Cadet Corps
Krasnoyarsk Cadet Corps
Magnitogorsk Cadet Corps
Georgy Zhukov Moscow Cadet Corps
 Moscow Cossacks Cadet Corps
 Moscow Cadet Corps of Military Music
 Moscow Cadet Corps of the Ministry of Emergency Situations of Russia
 Moscow Diplomatic Cadet Corps
 Moscow Cadet Corps "Heroes of the Battle of Stalingrad"
St.Petersburg Space Forces Cadet Corps
St.Petersburg Strategic Rocket Forces Cadet Corps
St.Petersburg Artillery Cadet Corps
The 1st St. Petersburg Border guard Cadet Corps of the FSB
Tambov Cadet Corps
Toliatti Cadet Corps
Ufa Cadet Corps
 The Sea Cadet Corps
 Kronstadt S.C.C.
 Moscow Representative Sea Cadet Corps of the Navigation and Mathematics School
 Moscow Sea Cadet Corps Heroes of Sevastopol

Secondary education

 Suvorov Military Schools are a type of boarding school in modern Russia for boys aged 14–18. Education in such these schools focuses on military related subjects.
 Irkutsk S.M.S.
 Kazan S.M.S.
 Moscow S.M.S.
 Moscow Military Music College
 North Caucasus S.M.S.
 Orenburg S.M.S.
 Perm S.M.S. 
 St. Petersburg Space Forces S.M.S.
 Tula S.M.S. (reopening 2016 after 56 years of closure)
 Tver S.M.S.
 Ulyanovsk S.M.S.
 Ussuriysk S.M.S.
 Yekaterinburg S.M.S.

 Nakhimov Naval School is a form of higher naval education for teenagers introduced in modern Russia.
 St. Petersburg N.N.S.
 Murmansk N.N.S.
 Kaliningrad N.N.S
 Sevastopol N.N.S.
 Vladivostok N.N.S.

Post-secondary education

 Combined Arms Academy of the Armed Forces of the Russian Federation
 Gagarin Air Force Academy (now the Gagarin-Zhukovsky Combined Air Force Academy)
 Military Engineering-Technical University
 Saint Petersburg Mining Institute
 Alexander Popov Naval Radio-electronic Academy
 Military Materiel Security Academy 
 Pacific Naval Institute
 Moscow Peter the Great Strategic Rocket Forces Academy
 Moscow Higher Military Command School
 Baltic Naval Institute
 Sevastopol Black Sea Higher Naval Institute
 Military University of the Ministry of Defense of the Russian Federation
 Far Eastern Higher Combined Arms Command School
 Budyonny Military Academy of the Signal Corps
 Yekaterinburg Force Command School of Artillery
 Air General Staff Center of Missile and Air Defense Excellence
 Khabarovsk Military Commanders Training Academy
 Civil Defense Academy of the Ministry of Emergency Situations
 Sergey Kirov Military Communications Academy
 S.M. Kirov Military Medical Academy
 St. Petersburg Military College of Physical Fitness and Sports
 Marshal Aleksander Vasilevsky Military Academy of the Armed Forces Air Defense Branch
 Moscow Border Guards Superior College
 Military University of the Ministry of Internal Affairs

Staff college
 General staff Academy
 N. G. Kuznetsov Naval Academy

Serbia

 Military Academy Belgrade
 Military Medical Academy (Serbia)

Singapore 

 SAFTI Military Institute
 Officer Cadet School (OCS): trains officers
 SAF Advanced Schools: conducts specialised training for officers
 Goh Keng Swee Command and Staff College: trains senior officers to take up command and staff appointments
 Specialist and Warrant Officer Institute (SWI)
 SAFWOS Leadership School: trains warrant officers and military experts
 Specialist and Warrant Officer Advanced School: conducts advanced courses for warrant officers, military experts and specialists (NCOs)
 Specialist Cadet School: trains specialists (NCOs)

Somalia
 Camp TURKSOM trains both officers and NCOs, offers a two-year course for officers and a one-year course for NCOs.

South Africa
 South African Military Academy provides officers in the SANDF with an opportunity to earn a 3yr BMil degree.

Spain
General Military Academy, Zaragoza
Academia General del Aire, San Javier
Naval Military Academy, Marín
 Escuela Superior de las Fuerzas Armadas
 Academia Central de la Defensa
 Academia de Artillería
 Academia de Infantería
 Academia de Caballería
 Academia de Ingenieros
 Academia de Logística
 Academia General Básica de Suboficiales
 Navy NCO School
 Academia Básica del Aire
 Escuela Militar de Montaña y Operaciones Especiales

Sri Lanka

University
General Sir John Kotelawala Defence University, Colombo

Officer training
Sri Lanka Military Academy, Diyatalawa
Naval and Maritime Academy, Trincomalee
Air Force Academy, SLAF China Bay, Trincomalee

Staff training
Defence Services Command and Staff College

Sweden

Undergraduate officer training

Military Academy Karlberg, officers
Military Academy Halmstad, specialist officers (NCO) and reserve officers

Postgraduate training
Swedish Defence University

Tanzania
Tanzania Military Academy

Thailand
Armed Forces Academies Preparatory School (secondary level)
Chulachomklao Royal Military Academy (university level)
Phramongkutklao College of Medicine (medicine, university level)
Royal Thai Navy Academy (university level)
Royal Thai Air Force Academy (university level)
 Royal Thai Police Cadet Academy
 Medicine, University level
 Phramongkutklao College of Medicine
 Royal Thai Army Nursing College
 Royal Thai Navy Nursing College
 Royal Thai Air Force Nursing College
 Royal Thai Police Nursing College

Turkey

National Defense University
 Turkish Military Academy
 Turkish Naval Academy
 Turkish Air Force Academy

Turkmenistan

 Military Academy of Turkmenistan (founded in 2007)
 Military Institute of the Ministry of Defense of Turkmenistan
 Berdimuhamed Annayev 1st Specialized Military School (Ashgabat)
 Alp Arslan 2nd Specialized Military School (Dashoguz)
 Soltan Sanjar 3rd Specialized Military School (Mary)
 Turkmen State Border Service Institute
 Institute of the Ministry of Internal Affairs of Turkmenistan
 Turkmen National Security Institute
 Turkmen Naval Institute

Uganda

Uganda maintains the followings military training institutions, as of December 2010:

 Bihanga Military Training School –  at Bihanga, in Ibanda District, Western Uganda
 Kalama Warfare Training School –  at Kabamba, Mubende District
 National Leadership Institute (NALI) –  at Kyankwanzi, Kyankwanzi District
 Oliver Tambo School of Leadership –  at Kaweweta, Nakaseke District
 Uganda Air Defence and Artillery School –  at Nakasongola in Nakasongola District
 Uganda Military Airforce Academy –  at Nakasongola in Nakasongola District
 University of Military Science and Technology –  at Lugazi, Buikwe District
 Uganda Junior Staff College –  at Qaddafi Barracks, Jinja
 Uganda Military Academy –  at Kabamba, Mubende District
 Uganda Senior Command and Staff College –  at Kimaka, Jinja
 Uganda Urban Warfare Training School –  at Singo, Kiboga District

Ukraine
A number of universities have specialized military institutes, such as the Faculty of Military Legal Studies at Kharkiv's National Yaroslav Mudryi Law Academy of Ukraine; however, the primary Ukrainian military academies are the following:
 Hetman Petro Sahaydachnyi Military Academy, Lviv
 Admiral Pavel Nakhimov Naval Academy, Odessa
 Ivan Kozhedub Air Force University, Kharkiv

Staff colleges
 National Defence University of Ukraine "Ivan Chernyakhovsky", Kyiv

United Kingdom

Pre-University level institution

Duke of York's Royal Military School – Military based secondary school in Dover, Kent; students are influenced to join the forces after education, but have no commitment to do so.

There are also numerous Cadet forces that operate for all branches of the armed forces for children aged 10–20. These are not designed to recruit people into the armed forces but rather are simply Ministry of Defence sponsored youth organisations.

Undergraduate service
Although an undergraduate degree is not a prerequisite for Officer training, the majority of potential Officers will have attended University before joining the Armed Forces. At some universities there may be the option for people to join either a University Royal Naval Unit, a University Officer Training Corps (UOTC) or a University Air Squadron, which are designed to introduce students to life in the Forces and show them the careers that are available. People sponsored under the Defence Technical Undergraduate Scheme will join one of the four Support Units attached to universities participating in DTUS. There is a requirement for bursars of DTUS to join the military for three years after completion of their degree, there no requirement for students of any other organisation to join the military after they finish their degree programs; and the great majority have no further contact with the armed forces. Although service with these organisations may give some initial benefit to cadets attending the military colleges/academies, the next stage of the officer training programs assumes no prior military experience/knowledge, and those that did not partake in military activities at university are not disadvantaged.

Officer training

There are now four military academies in the United Kingdom. Although the curriculum at each varies due to the differing nature of the service a man or woman is joining, it is a combination of military and academic study that is designed to turn young civilians into comprehensively trained military officers.

Britannia Royal Naval College, HMS Dartmouth
Commando Training Centre Royal Marines
Royal Military Academy Sandhurst
Royal Air Force College Cranwell

Officer Training for the Reserve Forces (e.g. Army Reserve, Royal Naval Reserve, RAF Reserves and Royal Marines Reserves) also takes place at the relevant military academies, but under a different curriculum and the courses tend to be concentrated into a much shorter period – a significant amount of the study will be undertaken at the cadet's reserve unit.

Postgraduate and staff training
Defence Academy of the United Kingdom
Royal College of Defence Studies (mainly for officers of Colonel/Brigadier or equivalent rank selected as future senior leaders; highly selective)
Joint Services Command and Staff College (courses for officers from Major to Brigadier or equivalent rank)
Defence College of Management and Technology
Armed Forces Chaplaincy Centre
Advanced Research and Assessment Group
Conflict Studies Research Centre

United States

Introduction
In the United States, the term "military academy" does not necessarily mean a government-owned institution run by the armed forces to train its own officers. It may also mean a middle school, high school, or college, whether public or private, which instructs its students in military-style education, discipline and tradition. Students at such civilian institutions can earn a commission in the U.S. military through the successful completion of a Reserve Officer Training Corps program along with their college or university's academic coursework.

The term military school primarily refers to pre-collegiate secondary-school-level military institutions.
The term military academy commonly refers to a pre-collegiate, collegiate, and post-collegiate institution, especially the U.S. military-run academies.
 The term US military staff colleges refers to separate graduate schools catering to officers on active duty .

Most state-level military academies maintain both a civilian student body and a traditional corps of cadets. The only exception is the Virginia Military Institute, which remains all-military.

Federal service academies

The colleges operated by the U.S. Federal Government, referred to as federal service academies, are:

United States Military Academy, West Point, New York
United States Naval Academy, Annapolis, Maryland
United States Air Force Academy, Colorado Springs, Colorado
United States Coast Guard Academy, New London, Connecticut
United States Merchant Marine Academy, Kings Point, New York

Post-graduate school
Uniformed Services University of the Health Sciences, Bethesda, Maryland

Senior and junior military colleges

There is one all-military state-sponsored military academy:

The Virginia Military Institute (VMI), Lexington, Virginia

In addition, these five institutions that were military colleges at the time of their founding now maintain both a corps of cadets and a civilian student body. Many of these institutions also offer on-line degree programs:

University of North Georgia, Dahlonega, Georgia — Formed by a 2013 merger with Gainesville State College, its main predecessor institution, last known as North Georgia College & State University, was chartered as a military college. However, when NGCSU was founded in 1873 as North Georgia Agricultural College, it had both a corps and a civilian student body, and was also the state's first coeducational college.
Norwich University Corps of Cadets. Norwich University, Northfield, Vermont is a private university in Northfield, Vermont. It is the oldest private military college in the United States. The university was founded in 1819 at Norwich, Vermont, as the American Literary, Scientific and Military Academy. It is the oldest of six senior military colleges, and is recognized by the United States Department of Defense as the "Birthplace of ROTC"
Texas A&M Corps of Cadets, Texas A&M University, College Station, Texas
The Citadel, The Military College of South Carolina, Charleston, South Carolina
Virginia Tech Corps of Cadets, Virginia Polytechnic Institute and State University, Blacksburg, Virginia

Along with VMI, these institutions are known as the senior military colleges of the US.

Today four institutions are considered military junior colleges (MJC). These four military schools participate in the Army's two-year Early Commissioning Program, an Army ROTC program where qualified students can earn a commission as a Second Lieutenant after only two years of college. The four military Junior colleges are as follows:

Georgia Military College, Milledgeville, Georgia
Marion Military Institute, Marion, Alabama
New Mexico Military Institute, Roswell, New Mexico
Valley Forge Military Academy and College, Wayne, Pennsylvania

Merchant Marine Academies that have military academy-style operations

There are six state-operated Merchant Marine academies:
 Massachusetts Maritime Academy
 Maine Maritime Academy
 State University of New York Maritime College (part of the State University of New York (SUNY) system)
 Texas A&M Maritime Academy (part of the Texas A&M University System)
 Great Lakes Maritime Academy (a division of Northwestern Michigan College)
 California State University Maritime Academy (part of the California State University system)

These merchant marine academies operate on a military college system. Part of the training that the cadets receive is naval and military in nature. Cadets may apply for Naval Reserve commissions upon obtaining their Merchant Marine Officer's licenses. Most if not all also offer some form of military commissioning program into the active duty US Navy, US Marine Corps, or US Coast Guard.

Staff colleges
The United States staff colleges, mandated to serve the needs of officers for post-graduate studies and other such graduate institutions as mandated by the Department of Defense are:

United States Air Force Air University attached staff colleges
 The Air University in Maxwell AFB, Alabama, includes:
 Squadron Officer College and Squadron Officer School
 Air Command and Staff College
 USAF Air War College

Staff colleges of the United States Army

 United States Army Command and General Staff College
 United States Army School of Advanced Military Studies
 United States Army War College

Staff colleges of the United States Navy and the United States Marine Corps
 Naval War College
 Naval Postgraduate School
 Marine Corps University

Joint Service staff colleges

 National Defense University in Washington, D.C., includes:
 Joint Forces Staff College (Norfolk, Virginia)
 National War College
 Dwight D. Eisenhower School for National Security and Resource Strategy
 Defense Acquisition University

Other post-graduate colleges operated by the DoD
 National Intelligence University (military intelligence)
 The Judge Advocate General's Legal Center and School (legal services training)
 Air Force Judge Advocate General's School (legal services training)
 Naval Justice School (legal services training)

Uzbekistan

 Academy of the Armed Forces of Uzbekistan (formerly the Tashkent Higher All-Arms Command School)
 Joint Service Officer Training Academy
 Tashkent Higher Tank Command School
 Samarkand Higher Military Automobile Command School
 Higher Military Customs Institute
 Academy of the Ministry of Internal Affairs of Uzbekistan
 Military-Technical Institute of the National Guard of Uzbekistan
 Uzbekistan Air Academy

Vietnam

National Defense Academy of Vietnam in Hanoi, Vietnam
Lê Quý Đôn Technical University in Hanoi, Vietnam
Vietnam Naval Academy in Nha Trang, Khánh Hòa Province, Vietnam

Zimbabwe
 Zimbabwe National Defence University

See also
Military high school
List of fictional schools
List of government-run higher-level national military academies
Military building
Military education and training

Further reading
 Cadet, Linton Hall, Linton Hall Military School Memories: One cadet's memoir, Scrounge Press, 2014.  Memoir of cadet who attended a military school for boys ages 6 to 16.

External links

References

 
Types of university or college